Jet Chip Wasp (also referred to as 2-3 Jet Chip Wasp) was an American football play between Kansas City Chiefs players Patrick Mahomes and Tyreek Hill against the San Francisco 49ers on third-down-and-15 midway through the fourth quarter of Super Bowl LIV on February 2, 2020. The play helped begin the Chiefs comeback, which ultimately led to the Chiefs winning their first Super Bowl in 50 years.

Super Bowl LIV game action prior to the play
After entering halftime with a 10-10 tie, San Francisco took the second half kickoff and drove 60 yards in nine plays, with Emmanuel Sanders catching two passes for 20 yards, Samuel rushing for 14 yards and Juszczyk hauling in a 14-yard reception. Gould finished the drive with a 42-yard field goal, giving the 49ers a 13–10 lead. Linebacker Fred Warner intercepted Mahomes on the next drive, returning it three yards to the San Francisco 45-yard line. 49ers quarterback Jimmy Garoppolo started the ensuing drive with a 16-yard pass to Samuel. Three plays later, on 3rd and 8, he threw a 26-yard pass to receiver Kendrick Bourne and then followed it up with a 10-yard pass to Juszczyk on the Chiefs 1-yard line. Raheem Mostert ran the ball into the end zone on the next play, increasing the 49ers' lead to 20–10 with 2:35 left in the third quarter.

On Kansas City's next drive, they drove the ball to the 49ers 23-yard line. On a 3rd and 6, Mahomes threw a pass intended for Tyreek Hill that was slightly behind the receiver. Hill tried to reach back for it, but the ball bounced off his arm and was intercepted by cornerback Tarvarius Moore, who returned it seven yards to the 49ers 20-yard line with 11:57 left in the game. After the Chiefs defense rallied to force a punt, Kansas City got the ball with 8:53 left in the game. After a challenge by San Francisco succeeded in overturning the call on a completed pass that would have secured a first down, the Chiefs faced 3rd-and-15 on their own 35-yard line.

The play

In the pause while the previous play was being reviewed, Patrick Mahomes approached Chiefs offensive coordinator Eric Bieniemy and asked "Do we have time to run Wasp?" Bienemy responded "you like Wasp?" and spoke into his headset "He’s asking for Wasp." He then asked Mahomes, "What down and distance do you like it?" Mahomes responded, "If it’s first-and-10, Wasp, or I’ll run it at any down and distance, I don’t care."

The Chiefs had successfully run a similar play in the 2018 AFC Championship Game against the New England Patriots. In the play's design, the top 3 Chiefs receivers (Hill, Travis Kelce, and Sammy Watkins) all are lined up on the same side of the field. Watkins is lined up on the outside and runs a deep square-in route. On the inside, Kelce runs a stutter-cross, and in the middle, Hill runs a 'wasp' route, in which he begins to run a deep crossing route, leading defenders towards the middle of the field before cutting sharply towards the sideline.

When the play was run again in Super Bowl LIV, it was defended by the 49ers using Zone Coverage. Cornerback Emmanuel Moseley was responsible for the outside deep third of the field where Hill cut towards, but cut forward to cover Watkins and lost track of Hill. Safety Jimmie Ward was covering the middle third of the field, but cut inwards in anticipation of the crossing route, leaving Hill open towards the sideline. Mahomes was pressured quickly by DeForest Buckner, causing him to drop back 14 yards behind the line of scrimmage and release the ball without firmly planting and winding up. Mahomes was tackled by Buckner immediately after his release of the ball, but nevertheless was able to throw the ball 57.1 yards in the air (the longest air-distance of any of Mahomes' completions in the 2019 season) and successfully reach an open Tyreek Hill.

Broadcasting calls

Television
Joe Buck made the call with Troy Aikman for Fox. Before the play was called, Fox broadcaster Troy Aikman noted Mahomes' poor play in the game leading up to the play and the incompletion on the previous play: "He's not played well, Joe. He's missed some open guys, he's had interceptions as a result of it, and that should have been his easiest completion of the night." Buck's call of the play:

Radio
Chiefs broadcaster Mitch Holthus and Kendall Gammon broadcast the call for 101 The Fox, the team's flagship station. Holthus's call:

Significance and aftermath
After the completion, the Chiefs were still down ten points with just over six minutes remaining.  The Chiefs scored on each of their following three possessions while holding the 49ers scoreless on each of their remaining drives, leading to a 31–20 victory, the first Super Bowl victory by the Chiefs in 50 years.

Analysts as well as the Chiefs players described Jet Chip Wasp as the turning point in the game. When asked about the momentum shift in his postgame interview, Mahomes referenced Jet Chip Wasp, saying "I think it was the third-and-15 when we hit Tyreek down the field," Mahomes said. "We were in a bad situation, especially with that pass rush. You knew those guys had their ears pinned back and they were going to be rushing. I think the offensive line gave me enough time to throw a really deep route, and I just put it out there and Tyreek made a really great play and so that got us going there."

Kansas City Star reporter Vahe Gregorian described the significance of the play in changing the momentum of the game in favor of the Chiefs: "Seconds after defeat had appeared imminent, victory seemed almost inevitable. Abracadabra. It felt like magic. Or looked like fortune. But the intricate choreography, including the protection and a crucial decoy pattern by Sammy Watkins, reflected repetition after repetition at the very core of the fusion of Reid’s creativity and Mahomes’ transcendent talents." According to Mahomes, "It kind of encompassed a lot of stuff that we had run the entire season."

The Chiefs used the momentum from their Super Bowl victory to go 14–2 in the 2020 season. They pulled off a 22–17 win over the Cleveland Browns, followed by a 38–24 victory over the Buffalo Bills to win their second straight Lamar Hunt trophy and move on to Super Bowl LV, which they would lose to the Tampa Bay Buccaneers 31–9. The following year, the Chiefs returned to the AFC Championship Game against the Cincinnati Bengals after a thrilling overtime triumph against the Bills in a rematch. However, the Chiefs couldn't hold on to a 21–3 first half lead and lost in overtime 27–24. Meanwhile, the 49ers returned to the NFC Championship in 2021 after a rough 2020 campaign in which they finished last in the NFC West, only to lose to the eventual champion Los Angeles Rams 20–17 after blowing a 17–7 fourth-quarter lead. The 49ers again returned to the NFC Championship in 2022, but lost to the Philadelphia Eagles 31–7. That year, the Chiefs won their AFC Championship rematch against the Bengals 23–20, then defeated the Eagles 38–35 in Super Bowl LVII.

The play quickly became remembered as one of the signature plays of Chiefs history and of the 2019 NFL season, drawing comparisons among journalists with "65 Toss Power Trap", the Chiefs' touchdown-scoring play in Super Bowl IV. In the NFL's official list of the top 100 plays of the 2019 season, Jet Chip Wasp was named as the top play overall. After the Chiefs victory, the play was added to the usable playbook of Madden NFL 20. References to the name and design of Jet Chip Wasp quickly became a popular inspiration among Chiefs fans for merchandise, artwork, and other commemorations.

References

External links
 How "2-3 Jet Chip Wasp" Harmonized the Perfect Trio at the Perfect Time | America's Game (NFL Films excerpt from Super Bowl LIV America's Game: The Super Bowl Champions film describing 2-3 Jet Chip Wasp)
 How Mahomes Made 3rd & 15 Magic in Super Bowl LIV | NFL Turning Point (NFL Films 'Turning Point' video analyzing and describing the significance of 2-3 Jet Chip Wasp)

Kansas City Chiefs postseason
San Francisco 49ers postseason
2019 National Football League season
American football incidents
February 2020 sports events in the United States
2020 in sports in Florida
2020s in Miami
Super Bowl plays